Ardit Krymi (born 2 May 1996) is an Albanian professional footballer who plays as a defensive midfielder for Belarusian club FC Shahter and the Albania national under-21 team.

Club career
In June 2022, he moved to Shakhtyor Soligorsk from Belarus.

International career 
Krymi was called up by coach Alban Bushi for the Friendly match against France U21 on 5 June 2017 and the 2019 UEFA European Under-21 Championship qualification opening match against Estonia U21 on 12 June. In the opening match of the qualifiers against Estonia U21, Krymi was an unused substitute in the bench for the entire match.

Career statistics

Club

References

External links

Ardit Krymi profile FSHF.org

 Profile - Vllaznia

1996 births
Living people
Footballers from Shkodër
Albanian footballers
Association football midfielders
Albanian expatriate footballers
Expatriate footballers in Belarus
KF Vllaznia Shkodër players
FC Shakhtyor Soligorsk players
Kategoria Superiore players
Kategoria e Parë players